The men's 3000 metres steeplechase event at the 1967 Summer Universiade was held at the National Olympic Stadium in Tokyo on 4 September 1967. It was the first time that the event was held at the Universiade.

Results

References

Athletics at the 1967 Summer Universiade
1967